The fifth series of Gladiators (subtitled Gladiators: The Challenge) aired in the UK from 28 September 1996 to 11 January 1997.

Gladiators

Episodes

 Adrean injured his hamstring on the balance beam and didn't finish the eliminator, Ultimately he had to retire.
 Patrick picked up a neck injury on Hit & Run and could not run the eliminator, forcing him to retire from the competition. Emmil won by default but had to run the eliminator against the clock to advance to the next round.
 These events had the female Gladiators against the male contenders.
 Warrior incidentally carrying an injury voulunteered to play with the female gladiators.
 In these special episodes, there were 6 contenders with 2 being eliminated after event 3 and another 2 being eliminated after event 5.

References

1996 British television seasons
1997 British television seasons
series five